Étoile Carouge FC is a Swiss football team based in Carouge and founded in 1904. It currently plays in the Promotion League and holding home games at Stade de la Fontenette, which seats up to 3,690 spectators.

History

Carouge had survived several seasons in the second tier of Swiss football, the Challenge League, until the 2011–12 season. Due to restructuring of the Swiss Football League, it was announced that the bottom 6 teams of the 10 team division would be relegated to a newly formed division in 2012, rather than the usual two teams being relegated. Carouge finished four points from safety, and were relegated to the 1. Liga Promotion.

Current squad
As of 1 September 2022.

References

External links
  

 
Football clubs in Switzerland
Association football clubs established in 1904
Canton of Geneva
Carouge
1904 establishments in Switzerland